Greg Richardson (born February 7, 1958) is a former professional boxer who was WBC Bantamweight Champion between February 25, 1991, and September 19, 1991.

Early life, family and education
Richardson was born in Youngstown, Ohio. He was raised on its East Side.

Other members of Richardson's family have excelled in sports. He is an uncle of former Florida Gators cornerback Keiwan Ratliff and light middleweight boxer Durrell Richardson.

He began boxing in the late 1960s. In 1974, he was the National AAU and National Golden Gloves flyweight champion.

Athletic career
Known as "The Flea", Richardson turned pro in 1982. Richardson's professional boxing career peaked in February 1991, when he scored an upset victory over Raúl Pérez and won the WBC world bantamweight title. Trained by Earl Charity, Richardson's quick reflexes were credited with earning him a 12-round unanimous decision over Perez, who held the title for almost 28 months. He defended the title against Victor Rabanales, before losing the belt to Joichiro Tatsuyoshi in 1991. In 1992 he moved down in weight to take on WBC super flyweight title holder Moon Sung-kil, but lost a majority decision. He retired in 1996.

During his career, Richardson also held the NABF Bantamweight Title, as well as the USBA Bantamweight and Super Bantamweight Titles.

Career after boxing

Personal life

Professional boxing record

See also
List of bantamweight boxing champions

References

External links

1958 births
Living people
Boxers from Youngstown, Ohio
American male boxers
African-American boxers
Super-flyweight boxers
Bantamweight boxers
Super-bantamweight boxers
World bantamweight boxing champions
World Boxing Council champions
Winners of the United States Championship for amateur boxers
National Golden Gloves champions
21st-century African-American people
20th-century African-American sportspeople